A discography for the bands Submarine and Jetboy DC.

Sessionographies are also included.

Submarine

Singles

chemical tester
format: 7-inch single

record label: ultimate recording company

catalogue no.: topp 014

released: October 1992

details: mail-order editions on clear vinyl, plain black sleeve, rubber-stamped record label.

promo pressings on black vinyl with sticker, badge, postcard & promo sheet

tracks:

a.salty killer whales

b.chemical tester

dinosaurs
format: 12-inch single/cd single

record label: ultimate recording company

catalogue no.: topp 11t/topp 11 cd

released: 25 January 1993

details: "smile" not listed on sleeve; promo copies with gold contact sticker for "jo bartlett" at the "ultimate promotions office"

tracks:

a.
dinosaurs

b.
learning to live with ghosts
smile

jodie foster
format: 7-inch single

record label: ultimate recording company

catalogue no.: topp 018

released: July 1993

details: fold-out poster sleeve, bloody red vinyl, mail order only, tugboat is a Galaxie 500 cover. tugboat features Claire Lemmon of Sidi Bou Said on additional guitar and vocals.

tracks:

a.Jodie Foster (live Sussex University 11/2/93)

b.tugboat

lips and fingers
format: 7-inch single/CD single

record label: Ultimate recording company

catalogue no.: topp 021/topp 021 cd

released: 21 February 1994

details: foldout poster sleeve, yellow vinyl, CD has "lips and fingers" (radio edit);

promo copy with sticker:

it's the sound of disturbed tranquility. catch this n. London trio:
18/2 London powerhaus,
19/2 Southampton joiners arms,
21/2 derby wherehouse,
32/2 Glasgow nice n sleazy,
24/2 Bristol the mauretania

& "out there promotions release date 21 feb 1994"

the CD (UK only) also has tugboat (same version as on "Jodie Foster" single).
a promo video for "lips & fingers" was filmed.

directed by: spencer ferszt

released: 12 January 1994

tracks:

a:
lips and fingers

b:
lynn marie
consolation prize
tugboat (CD single only bonus track:)

jnr elvis
format: 7-inch single

record label: Ultimate recording company

catalogue no.: topp 025

released: 1994

details: 'alaphabet st.' is not listed on record sleeve or label

tracks:

a.
junior elvis

b.
when you wear my ring
alphabet st.

promo flexi
format: 7" flexi disc

record label: Ultimate Recording Company

catalogue no.: topp fl-1

released: ???

details:flexi included free with some copies of "Crack-Uzis-'N-Safe Sex In The Streets Volume One".

tracks:

the werefrogs - nixie cocussion (topp 12)
submarine - dinosaurs (topp 11)
Sidi Bou Said -twilight eyes (topp14)

Albums

submarine s/t
format: cd | lp | cassette

record label: ultimate recording company

catalogue no.: topp CD 007 | topplp 007 | topp mc007

released: 21 March 1994

details: UK release only

tracks:

I can't be satisfied
electric bathing
jnr. elvis
empty
lips and fingers
never be alright again
fading
 jodie foster
alright sunshine song

she don't like the bee-gees
format: cd CD-R (2 editions)

record label: taky recordings

catalogue no.:
 taky 001 (she don't like the bee-gees)

released: 2006

details: this is the legendary "lost" album submarine recorded in Chicago with Keith Cleversley, released in two editions, 100 in CD tin, 400 in gatefold cardboard sleeve. tracks:

she don't like the bee-gees (taky001) track listing:

devil gets things done
nycg
big barry white
move into mars
cool haired girl
junk frequency
look like shit
slow Tuesday
queen bee
when i loved her *

kiss me till your ears burn Off
format: cd

record label: fantastik!

catalogue no.: fan-102-2

released: 1994

details: compilation of most early A side single tracks, excluding:
'smile' (topp 11t/topp 11 cd);'lips and fingers (radio edit)', 'lynn marie',
'consolation prize' (topp 021/topp 021 cd);
'when You wear my ring', 'alphabet St.' (topp 025) (us release only)

tracks:

chemical tester
salty killer whales
dinosaurs
learning to live with ghosts
smile
jodie foster (live)
tugboat
pollen

Compilation appearances

Volume Eight
format: CD+booklet

record label: volume

catalogue no.: 8vcd8

released: 1994

details: excellent interview w/ band in the book...

warsaw: un homenaje a Joy Division
format: CD

record label: el colectivo karma (now green ufo's)

catalogue no.: Karma 011

released: 1998

details: tribute to Joy Division, performed by Spanish artists (and Submarine). Submarine play "transmission". this song was the only 'officially' released recording made with new drummer, Rob Havis

tracks:

Automatics "Atmosphere"
Pribata Idaho "love will tear us apart"
señor chinarro "passover"
explosivos acme "the only mistake"
submarine "transmission"
sweetwater "the eternal"
honey langstrumpf "dead souls"
yellowfin "twenty four hours"
los planetas "disorder"
supernova "the drawback"
el niño gusano "she's lost control"
lord sickness "something must break"
long spiral dreamin' "wilderness"
mercromina "ceremony"
the flow "no love lost"
alias galor "failures"
strange fruit "new dawn fades"

Radio sessions

Submarine's 1st Peel session
format: BBC radio broadcast

record label: n/a

catalogue no.: n/a

released:
first broadcast 23 April 1993
second broadcast 25 September 1993

details:tugboat recorded with Claire Lemmon of Sidi Bou Said on backing vocals and additional guitar

tracks:

fading
junior elvis
tugboat

Submarine's 2nd Peel session
format: radio broadcast

record label: n/a

catalogue no.: n/a

released: first broadcast 12 March 1994

details: the "hate California song" previously unreleased

tracks:

the hate California song
empty
learning to live with ghosts

Demos
title: camp freddie

format: CD-r

record label: taky recordings

catalogue no.: taky001a

released: 2006

details: released with the first 100 CD-tin copies of 'she don't like the bee-gees'

tracks:
freaked out & high
space probe blues
the hate California song
junk frequency
jazzzz odyssey
screwin a boy
slow Tuesday
move into mars
space probe blues
goof off
I wanna fuck yer so much
devil gets things done
movin into mars
take it off
cruisin on the thermals

Live recordings
title: the slow motion world of submarine

format: cdr in cardboard gatefold billfold

record label: taky recordings

catalogue no.: taky sub01

released: 4/10/2003

details: 1st pressing, limited edition of five!
only known recording of "jesus, I want you".
the "hate California song" recorded in 12/03/94 peel session.
recorded at: water rats, Kings Cross, London, UK, 8 June 1994.
(only known recording of 'jesus, I want you')

tracks:

liquid intro
empty
jnr. elvis
hate California songs
lips and fingers
fading
jesus, i want you
i can't be satisfied
jodie foster

Sussex University
format: ?

record label: n/a

catalogue no.: n/a

released: n/a

details: "jodie foster" from topp 018 & fan-102-2 culled from this show
recorded 11/2/93 sussex university

tracks:
empty
dinosaurs
jodie foster
electric bathing
jnr. elvis
can't be satisfied

Sessionography

1992
singles recording

studio: elephant, Wapping, London

dates: 29 August to 1 September; 5 September & 6 September

produced: Keith Cleversley

tracks recorded:

chemical tester
salty killer whales
dinosaurs
learning to live with ghosts
smile

released:

October 1992
chemtester
salty killer whales

January 1993
dinosaurs
learning to live with ghosts
smile

1993
first session for John Peel show

studio: BBC, Maida Vale, London

date: 23 March

produced: ?

tracks:
jr elvis
fading
tugboat – (Claire Lemmon of Sidi Bou Said backup vocals and played guitar on Galaxie 500 cover of 'tugboat')

Self titled album (recording session)
studio: elephant, Wapping, London

dates: 11 April to 5 May

produced: Keith Cleversley

tracks :
i can't be satisfied
electric bathing
jnr. elvis
empty
lips and fingers
never be alright again
fading
jodie foster
alright sunshine song

released: March 1994

self-titled (topp CD 007 | topplp 007 |topp mc007)

b side recording
studio: Chiswick Reach, Chiswick, London, UK

date: 20 May

produced: Anjali Dutt

released: July 1993 – b side to jodie foster (live)– [also included on cd release of lips & fingers February 1994]

tracks:
tugboat (Claire Lemmon sang backing vocals and played guitar)

track for volume magazine
studio: battery, Willesden, London

date: 12 July

produced: Anjali Dutt

released: November 1993

volume 8 & kiss me till your ears fall off

track:
pollen

b side recording
studio: elephant studio, Wapping, London

date: 12 & 13 November 

produced: Teo Miller/Submarine

released: February 1994 – b side to lips & fingers

tracks:
consolation prize
lynn marie

1994
2nd session for John Peel show

studio: BBC, Maida Vale, London

date: 1 March

produced: Mike Robinson

tracks:
the hate California song
learning to live with ghosts
empty

b side recording
studio: elephant, Wapping, London/September sound, Twickenham

date: 1 & 2 April 

produced: Lincoln Fong/Matthew Kettle

released: May 1994 – b side to jnr. elvis.

tracks:
when you wear my ring
alphabet st.

Jetboy DC

Singles

she's so fine
format: CD

record label: monkeyland records

catalogue no.: nuts 001

released: 1997

details: still named "Jetboy" (no DC) at this point, "ssf karaoke" is a semi-vocal instrumental version of "she's so fine"

tracks:

She's so fine/ex-porn queen/ssf karaoke

Albums

(working title) relax your hair
format: n/a

record label: unreleased

catalogue no.: n/a

released: ?

details: this album has not yet been released!

tracks:

sweetest thing
then you smile
radio song
ted (I think i'm going to be sad)
nycg
if you see her out tonight
bug in a rug
you make the sun shine
cool haired girl

Compilations

best kept secrets (vol 1)
format: 7"

record label: dedicated

catalogue no.: secret 001

released: 1995/1996?

details: four track seven inch compilation

tracks:

side a:
jetboy: move it on up
aurora: question & answer

side b:
hardbody: blow the man down
toaster: biscuits

dark side of the raccoon
format: double 7" in gatefold cover

record label: fierce panda

catalogue no.: ning 44

released: 1998 (Jetboy DC track recorded 1997)

details:

tracks:

record one:

 high fidelity -"sick of it all"
 jam pandas -"shine"
 roo "your son's a write off"

record two:

 spraydog - "sweet thing"
 firebunnies - "where's your memory?"
 Jetboy DC -"now i'm gone"

Demos

title: ?
format:

record label:

catalogue no.:

released:

details:

tracks:
move it on up
John Lennon
baby baby
jetboy man
 (waking up to the) radio station

Discographies of British artists
Rock music group discographies